Wilfrid Walter Payne FRCP (25 March 1894 in Brighton – 28 December 1978) was a British pediatrician with his job title also being  biochemist and chemical pathologist He was notable for developing flame photometry and chromatography, enzymology, fat balances and chylomicron counting, and for conducting research on gastroenteritis, calcium and phosphorus metabolism, and on coeliac and fibrocystic diseases.

Life
Payne was the son of William Henry Payne, an accountant with the London, Brighton and South Coast Railway, and his wife, Alice Flora Smith. He was educated at Brighton Grammar School. His education at Guy's Hospital was interrupted by the start of World War I. He volunteered into the Royal Naval Reserve, serving as sub-lieutenant, spending the last two years of the war working on destroyers. In 1920, he completed his undergraduate training, and qualified at Guys, taking on a number of roles, eventually becoming medical assistant. During 1921, Payne married Winifred Grace, and had two children, a son and daughter.

In 1926, Payne transferred to Great Ormond Street Hospital, initially working as a chemist. His job specification name changed a number of times during his career. When he retired in 1959, from the medical profession, which was now called National Health Service, he immediately went back to work, working at the Queen Charlotte's Hospital for three years, followed by 7 years with the Neonatal Unit at Hammersmith Hospital. In 1968, Payne's first wife died. In 1971, he married Anne King. Payne moved to Bristol in 1969, where he worked in the Child Health Unit at the Bristol Royal Hospital for Children until 1973, when he finally retired.

Bibliography
Payne was considered a man of prodigious output but did little writing. These are his most important papers and all apart from the third paper were produced jointly.

 
 
 
 
 
 Free diet in the treatment of diabetes mellitus

Awards and accolades
Payne received the Dawson Williams Memorial Prize in 1959 and the James Spence Medal in 1971.

References

1894 births
1978 deaths
British paediatricians
Fellows of the Royal College of Physicians
Royal College of Surgeons of England
British biochemists
British chemists
Royal Naval Reserve personnel